Lime Island State Recreation Area is a  undeveloped state park in the U.S. state of  Michigan. The recreation area is located on Lime Island in the St. Marys River near its mouth. The park has no facilities except 5 primitive boat-in campsites. The park was purchased in 1982 and managed by the state's Forest Management Division until it was transferred to the Parks Department in 2011, becoming the 99th park unit. Lime Island contains historic sites from its history as summer camps of Woodland Indians, a lime kiln site, ship bunkering site, and a resort. Lime Island was one of the state forest campgrounds slated to be shut down due to funding cuts until it was transferred to the park program.

The island has occasional moose and black bear. Hunting, hiking and fishing are allowed in the park.

Notes

References

External links
Lime Island State Recreation Area, Michigan Department of Natural Resources, 2012

State recreation areas of Michigan
Protected areas of Chippewa County, Michigan
Important Bird Areas of Michigan